Juan Pablo Gil Almada (born November 16, 1989, in Culiacán, Sinaloa, México), is a Mexican actor who gained  popularity for his role as "Charlie Noble" in the Warner Bros film, Nosotros los Nobles.

Biography 
Juan Pablo Gil Almada was born on November 16, 1989. He trained at Centro de Educación Artística, Televisa's acting school. His acting career started in 2010 when he joined the cast of the stage production, Todo sobre mi madre, which premiered at the "Teatro de los Insurgentes". He shared credits with Ana Claudia Talancón, Margarita Gralia, Lisa Owen. Due to the play's success, it toured the major cities in Mexico.

Filmography

Film roles

Television roles

Awards and nominations

References

External links 
 

1989 births
Living people
21st-century Mexican male actors
Mexican male film actors
Mexican male stage actors
Mexican male telenovela actors
Mexican male television actors
Male actors from Sinaloa
People from Culiacán